Geoffrey Thomas Anderson (born 26 November 1944) is an English former professional footballer who scored 19 goals in 88 appearances in the Football League playing for Birmingham City, Mansfield Town and Lincoln City. He played as a right winger.

Career
Anderson was born in Sheerness, Kent. He played football for Canterbury Schools and for Southern League side Ramsgate before joining Birmingham City in December 1962. He was one of three teenagers who made their debuts on 11 January 1964 away at Manchester United in the First Division, the other two being Mickey Bullock and Ray Martin. Birmingham won the game 2–1, but Anderson never played for the club again; he signed for Mansfield Town in May 1964. In two seasons, he scored 13 goals in 43 games in the Third Division, and then moved on to Fourth Division club Lincoln City. After scoring seven goals in 48 appearances in all competitions in the 1966–67 season, he left the club. He finished his career with short spells at Brentford and Port Vale, though did not play a first team game for either club.

Career statistics
Source:

References

1944 births
Living people
People from Sheerness
English footballers
Association football wingers
Ramsgate F.C. players
Birmingham City F.C. players
Mansfield Town F.C. players
Lincoln City F.C. players
Port Vale F.C. players
Southern Football League players
English Football League players